Shout magazine may refer to:

Shout (magazine), a British Teen Magazine
 Shout NY (magazine), a NY Cult Thought and Culture Magazine (1998–2003)